Alisa Spahić (born 22 November 1990) is a Bosnian footballer who plays as a midfielder and has appeared for the Bosnia and Herzegovina women's national team.

Career
Spahić has been capped for the Bosnia and Herzegovina national team, appearing for the team during the 2019 FIFA Women's World Cup qualifying cycle.

References

External links
 
 
 

1990 births
Living people
Bosnia and Herzegovina women's footballers
Bosnia and Herzegovina women's international footballers
Women's association football midfielders